State Route 122 (SR 122) is a 7.11 mile long east–west state highway in Middle Tennessee. It connects the town of Huntland with the community of Elora. For the majority of its length, SR 122 is known as John Hunter Highway.

Route description

SR 122 begins in Lincoln County in Elora at an intersection with SR 121. It heads northeast as John Hunter Highway through farmland and rural countryside for several miles to cross into Franklin County. SR 122 then enters Huntland, where it comes to an intersection with SR 97. The highway turns north along Main Street and passes by several homes and businesses to come to an end at an intersection with US 64/SR 15. The entire route of SR 122 is a two-lane highway.

Major intersections

References

122
Transportation in Lincoln County, Tennessee
Transportation in Franklin County, Tennessee